Richie Fallows (born 17 June 1995 in London) is a professional squash player. He has represented England in international competitions. He reached a career-high world ranking of 50 in December 2015

References

External links 

English male squash players
Living people
1995 births